Denmark Hill railway station is in the area of Denmark Hill in south London, England, on the South London and Catford Loop lines. It is managed by Thameslink.

History

The station was built between 1864 and 1866. Its design by Charles Henry Driver is in the Italianate style, with an extremely decorative frontage and French pavilion roofs.

In 1920 the waiting room was used by The Mystical Church of the Comforter, founded by Elizabeth Mary Eagle Skinner, who was known as "The Messenger". The waiting room was transformed by an altar, painted white and surrounded by the seven colours of the rainbow. The Nottingham Evening Post for 17 June 1926 reported that babies were baptised, funeral services were read and even a marriage was solemnised. The porters and clerks of the railway company often worked to the accompaniment of hymns sung by the congregation. The church is believed to have ceased to function after the death of Skinner in November 1929.

By the late 1970s the building had been neglected. In March 1980, arsonists broke into the booking hall and the resulting fire destroyed the roof. Initial work by British Rail engineers to make the building safe by demolishing parts of the remaining building triggered a protest campaign by the Camberwell Society. Following a joint initiative between them, the Southwark Environment Trust and the British Rail Director of the Environment, Bernard Kaukas, the building was restored in 1985.

The project included the addition of a public house, initially called the Phoenix and Firkin to commemorate the fire, then called O'Neills and now the Phoenix. The building was given a Civic Trust award in 2009.

In the period 2011–2013 the station underwent a redesign with the construction of a new ticket office with access from Champion Park, new walkways and lifts to the platforms.

In September 2021, a second entrance opened on the north-eastern side of the station.

Design
The platforms are below road level, with the short Grove Tunnel at one end and Denmark Hill road bridge at the other.

Services

Services at Denmark Hill are operated by London Overground, Southeastern and Thameslink.

The station is in Travelcard Zone 2. It is on Champion Park in the south of Camberwell. It is near to King's College and Maudsley hospitals and to the Denmark Hill campus of King's College London, whose buildings are intermingled around and between the two hospitals.

Thameslink

The typical Peak/ Off Peak service in trains per hour is:
 5 / 2tph to London Blackfriars Then Peak: 2 tph  2 tph  1 tph terminates; Off Peak: 2tph terminate

Currently Suspended Off Peak Services:
 2 tph to London Blackfriars and on to 

Thameslink services at Denmark Hill are operated using  EMUs

Southeastern

The typical Peak/ Off Peak service in trains per hour is:
 4 / 3 tph to 
 2 / 2tph to  via 
 4 / 2tph to   stopping via  then 2 tph  and 2 tph 

Currently Suspended Off Peak Services:
 2 tph to   stopping via  to 

London Overground

The typical Peak/ Off Peak service in trains per hour is:
 4 / 4tph to 
 4 / 4tph to  via 

London Overground services at Denmark Hill are operated using  EMUs

Layout 
The station is on two lines: 

The South London line are the Southern pair of tracks (through Platforms 1 & 2) running to London Victoria and  
The Catford Loop Line  are the Northern pair (through Platforms 3 & 4) running to London Blackfriars & beyond to the Thameslink core and Victoria .

Platform 1: Southeastern to Victoria and London Overground to Clapham Junction
Platform 2: Southeastern to  / Dover Priory and London Overground to  / 
Platform 3: Thameslink to London Blackfriars,   and 

Southeastern trains to Victoria can use both 1 & 3 and their return services to Dartford, Gillingham and Dover can use 2 & 4, above are the default.

Connections
London Buses routes 40, 176, 185 and 484 serve the station.

See also 
Camberwell a disused station is located nearby

References

External links

Planning documents for 2011/12 station improvements, Southwark Council,

Camberwell
Charles Henry Driver railway stations
Grade II listed buildings in the London Borough of Southwark
DfT Category D stations
Former London, Brighton and South Coast Railway stations
Railway stations in Great Britain opened in 1865
Railway stations in the London Borough of Southwark
Railway stations served by London Overground
Railway stations served by Southeastern
Railway stations served by Govia Thameslink Railway
Recipients of Civic Trust Awards